Uyea ( in Shetland dialect spelling) is an uninhabited tidal island located to the northwest of Mainland, Shetland. Uyea lies off the Northmavine peninsula, from where it can be reached by foot at low tide.

There are several natural arches on its rocky coast, as well as challenging rock climbs. Surrounding skerries include Big Nev, Dorra Stack, Little Nev, Out Shuna Stack, Robert Irvine's Skerry, and The Burrier.

See also
Uyea, Unst

References

External links
 Images of Uyea

Tidal islands of Scotland
Uninhabited islands of Shetland
Northmavine
Underwater diving sites in Scotland
Natural arches of Scotland